Charles Nordhoff (31 August 1830 – 14 July 1901) was an American journalist, descriptive and miscellaneous writer.

Biography
He was born in Erwitte, Germany (Prussia) in 1830, and emigrated to the United States with his parents in 1835. He was educated in Cincinnati, and apprenticed to a printer in 1843. In 1844, he went to Philadelphia where he worked for a short time in a newspaper office.

He then joined the United States Navy in 1845 (aged 15), where he served three years and made a voyage around the world in the USS Columbus (1819), which was engaged in first attempts at opening up Japan to the U.S.A, and in establishing full diplomatic relations with China. After his Navy service, he remained at sea from 1847 in the merchant service, and then whaling, mackerel fishery ships until 1854 (aged 24).

From 1853 to 1857, he worked in various newspaper offices, first in Philadelphia, then in Indianapolis. He was then employed editorially by Harpers in 1857 until 1861, when he went to work the next ten years on the staff of the New York Evening Post, 1861-1871, and he later contributed to the New York Tribune.

From 1871 to 1873 Nordhoff traveled in California and visited Hawaii. He then became Washington correspondent of the New York Herald 1874-1890. Nordhoff died in San Francisco, California.

The Valley of Cross Purposes, an extensive biography by Carol Frost, PhD, was published in 2017.

Family
He was the father of Walter Nordhoff (1855-1937), author of The Journey of the Flame, penned under the name "Antonio de Fierro Blanco", and of Evelyn Hunter Nordhoff (ca. 1865–1898), America's first female bookbinder and printmaker.

He was the grandfather of Charles Bernard Nordhoff, co-author of Mutiny on the Bounty.

Legacy
The city of Ojai, California, was named for him originally. It was changed due to anti-German sentiment of the World War I era, though the local high school retains his name.

Nordhoff Street, in the San Fernando Valley of Los Angeles, is named in his honor.

This statement above about anti-German sentiment needs citation from the writer. There is no evidence that the name of the city changed from Nordhoff to Ojai due to anti-German sentiment. Research in the local newspaper, "The Ojai," revealed nothing regarding this. The fact is that the valley was named the Ojai Valley after the Chumash Indian word 'Awha'y meaning moon and it was generally called simply "the Ojai." In the Rancho period it was called by the Spanish name Rancho Ojay. There is a direct connection between the completion of the Spanish-style transformation of the downtown in the spring of 1917 and the name change. Many town promoters, including Edward Drummond Libbey, were in favor of renaming the town because they thought the name was a better, more meaningful fit. (References below).

Works
His most widely known books are Communistic Societies of The United States, and California for Health, Pleasure and Residence.

 Kern, Practical Landscape Gardening, editor (Cincinnati, 1855)
 Man-of-War Life: a Boy's Experience in the U. S. Navy, largely autobiographical (Cincinnati, 1855)
 The Merchant Vessel (1855)
 Whaling and Fishing (1855; new edition, 1903)
 Nine Years as a Sailor (1857)
 Stories from the Island World (New York, 1857)
 Secession Is Rebellion: the Union Indissoluble (1860)
 The Freedmen of South Carolina: Some Account of their Appearance, Character, Condition, and Customs (1863)
 America for Free Working Men! (1865)
 Cape Cod and All Along Shore, a collection of stories (1868)
 California: For Health, Pleasure, and Residence (1873)
 Northern California, Oregon, and the Sandwich Islands (1874)
 Politics for Young Americans (1875) This was adopted as a school textbook.
 The Communistic Societies of the United States (1875)
 The Cotton States in the Spring and Summer of 1875 (1876)
 God and the Future Life (1881)
 A Guide to California, the Golden State (1883)
 The merchant vessel - a sailor boy's voyages around the world (1884)
 Peninsular California (1888)

Notes

References 

 
"Inventing Ojai: When Edward Libbey's Vision Met Our Reality," by Mark Lewis, Ojai Quarterly magazine, Fall 2016, p.p. 123-126
"The Ojai Valley: An Illustrated History," 2017 (Version 7, June 2019), by Patricia L. Fry, Elise DePuydt, Craig Walker p.p. 232-233

External links 

 
 
 The Perfectionists of Oneida and Wallingford (online text)--Includes description of their "complex marriage" and rites of "criticism."
 California: for health, pleasure, and residence. A book for travellers and settlers (online text)

American male journalists
Writers from California
1830 births
1901 deaths
German emigrants to the United States
Ojai, California
Journalists from New York City